"Love Will Always Win" is a song written by Gordon Kennedy and Wayne Kirkpatrick. It was originally recorded by American singer Faith Hill for the international release of her 1998 album Faith, also titled Love Will Always Win. It was later recorded by American singers Garth Brooks and Trisha Yearwood for the former's The Lost Sessions, an album contained within his 2005 box set The Limited Series.

History
Faith Hill cut the song in 1998 for the international release of her 1998 album Faith, produced by herself and Byron Gallimore. In 2005, Garth Brooks recorded the song as a duet with his wife, Trisha Yearwood, for the album The Lost Sessions, a compilation of new and previously-unreleased material within his 2005 box set The Limited Series. Brooks and Yearwood performed the song on The Oprah Winfrey Show. Co-writers Gordon Kennedy and Wayne Kirkpatrick produced Brooks' and Yearwood's recording.

Critical reception
Chuck Taylor reviewed the single favorably in Billboard, calling it "a beautiful and timeless song of devotion" and "simple and straightforward".

Chart performance

References

1998 songs
2006 singles
Garth Brooks songs
Faith Hill songs
Trisha Yearwood songs
Songs written by Gordon Kennedy (musician)
Songs written by Wayne Kirkpatrick
Male–female vocal duets